HHO may refer to:

 Croatian Helsinki Committee
 HHO gas, a fringe science term for oxyhydrogen with a 2:1 ratio of hydrogen and oxygen
 Home heating oil

See also
 Herbig–Haro object (HH)